Scrobipalpa brahmiella is a moth of the family Gelechiidae. It is found in central Europe, from France to Slovakia, further east to the Lower Volga and the southern Ural.

The larvae feed on Jurinea cyanoides, Jurinea humilis, Jurinea mollis and Serratula species. They mine the leaves of their host plant. The mine has the form of a rounded, somewhat inflated blotch, which is made in the tip of the leaf or leaf segment. The frass is deposited in the leaf apex. This is also where hibernation takes place. Pupation takes place outside of the mine. The larvae are reddish brown. They can be found from October to April and again from July to August.

References

Moths described in 1862
Taxa named by Carl von Heyden
Scrobipalpa
Moths of Europe